Joseph Edward Troy (3 September 1931 – 12 March 2023) was a Canadian Roman Catholic prelate. He was coadjutor bishop (1984–1986) and bishop (1986–1997) of Saint John, New Brunswick.

References

1931 births
2023 deaths
Roman Catholic bishops of Saint John, New Brunswick
20th-century Roman Catholic bishops in Canada
21st-century Roman Catholic bishops in Canada
Bishops appointed by Pope John Paul II